Parabuteo is a genus of bird of prey in the family Accipitridae. It contains the following species:

 
Bird genera

Taxa named by Robert Ridgway